The Westminster Quarters, from its use at the Palace of Westminster, is a melody used by a set of four quarter bells to mark each quarter-hour. It is also known as the Westminster Chimes, Cambridge Quarters or Cambridge Chimes from its place of origin, the Church of St Mary the Great, Cambridge.

Description

The Westminster Quarters are sounded by four quarter bells hung next to Big Ben in the Elizabeth Tower belfry in the Palace of Westminster. These are:

The quarters consist of five changes, combinations of the four pitches provided by these quarter bells (G4, F4, E4, B3) in the key E major. This generates five unique changes as follows: 

 G4, F4, E4, B3
 E4, G4, F4, B3
 E4, F4, G4, E4
 G4, E4, F4, B3
 B3, F4, G4, E4

Each of the five changes is played as three crotchets (quarter note) and a minim (half note) and are always played in the sequence 1, 2, 3, 4, 5. This sequence of five changes is used twice every hour as follows:

First quarter, change 1.
Half hour, changes 2 and 3.
Third quarter, changes 4, 5 and 1
The full hour, changes 2, 3, 4 and 5 followed by one strike for each hour past 12 midnight or 12 noon struck on the Great Bell known as Big Ben in E3.
The number of changes used matches the number of quarter hours passed.

Because the five changes are used twice, and in the same sequence, the mechanism that trips the hammers needs to be programmed with only five changes instead of ten, reducing its complexity.

Both the third quarter and the full hour require the fourth quarter bell, B3, to be rung twice in quick succession (changes 4,5,1 and 2,3,4,5); too quick for the hammer to draw back for the second strike. To address this, the fourth quarter bell is equipped with two hammers on opposite sides and becomes, effectively, a fifth bell for the mechanism to play.

The first and third quarters finish on the dominant, B, while the half and full hours finish on the tonic, E, producing the satisfying musical effect that has contributed to the popularity of the chimes.

The following sounds have been recreated as electronic, MIDI files and do not necessarily represent the actual sounds of the bells and that the pitch of the Big Ben clip is closer to F than E in modern concert pitch.  An actual recording may be heard in the summary section above.

Words associated with the melody
The prayer inscribed on a plaque in the Big Ben clock room reads:
All through this hour
Lord be my guide
That by Thy power
No foot shall slide.

The conventional prayer is:
O Lord our God
Be Thou our guide
That by Thy help
No foot may slide.

An alternative prayer changes the third line:
O Lord our God
Be Thou our guide
So by Thy power
No foot shall slide.

A variation on this, to the same tune, is prayed at the end of Brownie meetings in the UK and Canada:
O Lord our God
Thy children call
Grant us Thy peace
And bless us all. Amen.

History

The Westminster Quarters were originally written in 1793 for a new clock in Great St Mary's, the University Church in Cambridge. There is some doubt over exactly who composed it: Joseph Jowett, Regius Professor of Civil Law, was given the job, but he was probably assisted by either John Randall (1715–1799), who was the Professor of Music from 1755, or his brilliant undergraduate pupil, William Crotch (1775–1847). This chime is traditionally, though without substantiation, believed to be a set of variations on the four notes that make up the fifth and sixth bars of "I know that my Redeemer liveth" from Handel's Messiah. This is why the chime is also played by the bells of the so-called Red Tower in Halle, the native town of Handel.

In 1851, the chime was adopted by Edmund Beckett Denison (an amateur horologist, and graduate of Trinity College, Cambridge, who was familiar with the Great St Mary's chime) for the new clock at the Palace of Westminster, where the bell Big Ben hangs. From there its fame spread. It is now one of the most commonly used chimes for striking clocks.

According to the church records of Trinity Episcopal Church (Williamsport, Pennsylvania), this chime sequence was incorporated into a tower clock mechanism by the E. Howard & Co., Boston, Massachusetts. The clock and chime in Trinity's steeple base was dedicated in December 1875. It holds the distinction of being the first tower clock in the United States to sound the Cambridge Quarters.

Other uses
 The symphony, A London Symphony, by Ralph Vaughan Williams incorporates the half hour changes, 2 and 3, near the beginning of the work and the first three changes of the hour, 2, 3 and 4, near the end.
 The theme music by Ronnie Hazlehurst  for the satirical TV series Yes Minister (1980–1984) and its sequel Yes, Prime Minister (1986–1988), about a British politician and his interactions with the civil servants who nominally serve him, is largely based on the chimes (though with a longer duration for the first note of each quarter, which arguably makes the derivation less obvious). When asked in an interview about its Westminster influence, Hazlehurst replied, "That's all it is. It's the easiest thing I've ever done."
 A piece Carillon de Westminster based on the chimes was written for organ by the French composer and organist Louis Vierne.
 The song "11 O'Clock Tick Tock", 1980, by rock band U2 incorporates the Third Quarter chime as a guitar harmonic.
 The song "Clock Strikes Ten" by Cheap Trick incorporates a guitar solo based on changes 4 and 5.
 The song  by 'Akai Ko-en, 2014, incorporates the Third Quarter chime.
 A composition based on the chimes was written in the ladrang form for central Javanese gamelan. It is named variously as ladrang Wesminster, ladrang Wesmister, ladrang Wèsmèster, etc.
 The football chant known as "Pompey" by local association football fans in Portsmouth, England, is a variation of the Westminster Quarters. "Pompey" is the nickname of the city of Portsmouth and the "Pompey Chimes" chant originated from the nearby chiming clock of Portsmouth Guildhall built in 1890.
 At Yankee Stadium, the chimes are played whenever a member of the New York Yankees scores a run, a tradition that began at their original ballpark (the beginning of "Workaholic" by 2 Unlimited).
 Indonesian train stations play the chimes as a sign of train departures and arrivals. Upon arrival, the chimes are looped continuously until departure, which may last up to 15 minutes.
 Most schools in Japan play the chimes to signal the end and beginning of classes.
 At the close of the Warner Bros. cartoons Now Hear This (1963), the first four notes of the Westminster Quarters play to bring on the four elements of the abstract "WB" lettering, then as the words "A Warner Bros. CartOOn" scroll appear, Big Ben chimes, and then as the letters OO in Cartoon separate from the words, a bicycle horn is heard squeaking three times. Big Ben gives one more chime as the words finish appearing on the screen before the fadeout.
 The chime can be heard in the 6  victory screens of several Five Nights at Freddy's games, specifically in games 1, 2, 3 and Ultimate Custom Night.

References

External links 
The parish of St Mary the Great with St Michael, Cambridge
The Straight Dope on the Westminster Quarters
The Cambridge Chimes
A music theory article on the Westminster Quarters and other clock chimes
Rochester Quarters
1941 British Horological Institute article on chimes rarely encountered by clock repairers

Clocks
Anonymous musical compositions